The Gran Premio Industria e Commercio di Prato is a single-day road bicycle race held annually in Prato, Italy. Since 2005, the race has been organised as a 1.1 event on the UCI Europe Tour.

Winners

External links
 

UCI Europe Tour races
Cycle races in Italy
Recurring sporting events established in 1946
1946 establishments in Italy